SFL may refer to:

Sports leagues 
 Southern Football League an association football league in England
 Geo Super Football League, an inter-city football league in Pakistan
 Scottish Football League, a former association football league
 Southern Football League (Scotland), wartime league
 Southern Football League (South Australia)
 Southern Football League (Tasmania), Australia
 Southern Football League (Victoria), Australia
 Stars Football League, Grand Rapids, Michigan, US
 Sunday Football League, Perth, Western Australia
 Sunday Football League (Lithuania)
 Super Fight League, mixed martial arts league, India
 Swedish Futsal League
 Swiss Football League

Organizations 
 Saskatchewan Federation of Labour, Canada
 Students for Liberty, Washington D.C., US
 Scandinavian Ferry Lines

Entertainment 
 Sci-Fi-London, a Film Festival in England

Other uses 
 System Function Language of the ICL VME operating system
 Systemic functional linguistics, language as a social semiotic system